Kolettis is a Greek surname. Notable people with the surname include:

 Ioannis Kolettis (1773–1847), Greek politician who served as Prime Minister of Greece
 Georgios Kolettis, Greek cyclist

Greek-language surnames
Surnames